2011 Masters may refer to:
 2011 Masters Tournament, golf
2011 Masters (snooker)
2011 Monte-Carlo Rolex Masters, tennis
2011 ATP World Tour Masters 1000, tennis
2011 Deutsche Tourenwagen Masters season, touring car racing
2011 ADAC Formel Masters season, open wheel racing
2011 National Masters, English indoor football